This list ranks China's bridges by the length of main span.

Longest spans

Under construction

See also
 List of bridges in China

Lists of bridges in China
Bridges, China